Dar Tang-e Sofla (also Romanized as Darreh Tang-e Soflá; also known as Darreh Tang and Darreh Tang-e Kahmān-e Soflá) is a village in Yusefvand Rural District, in the Central District of Selseleh County, Lorestan Province, Iran. At the 2006 census, its population was 792, in 181 families.

References 

Towns and villages in Selseleh County